The Operation Kopaonik  was a large-scale Axis offensive launched against the Mihailović's Chetniks in Axis occupied Yugoslavia during World War II. The operation was inspired by Heinrich Himmler who believed that the annihilation of Draža Mihailović and his forces was a basis for a success in Serbia and South East Europe. Since Dragutin Keserović and his Rasina Corps was probably the most active commander of Mihailovićs Chetniks in Serbia, the newly established 7th SS Volunteer Mountain Division Prinz Eugen was engaged to participate in Operation Kopaonik to destroy Keserović and Chetnik unit under his command.

Besides the 7th SS Volunteer Mountain Division Prinz Eugen the Axis forces consisted of several battalions of Bulgarian 9th Infantry Division also. All of them commanded by Artur Phleps. The Yugoslav forces targeted in the Operation Kopaonik consisted of Rasina Corps of Chetniks of Draža Mihailović under command of Dragutin Keserović. The operation failed because Keserović was informed about the movement of the Axis forces and successfully retreated his forces before the Axis forces surrounded the targeted region. Still, Himmler was pleased with participation of the Prinz Eugen Division and immediately after the operation ended he visited it for three days.

During this operation Axis forces committed mass murder of hundreds of Serb civilians in the targeted region. After the operation Prinz Eugen division attacked Mihailovićs Chetniks in region of Gornji Milanovac and Čačak.

Background 

According to Heinrich Himmler, the annihilation of Mihailovic and his forces was a basis for a success in Serbia and South East Europe. This operation was part of larger plan of Axis forces to disarm Chetnik units. The Military Commander in Serbia prepared a list of 24 Chetnik officers to be arrested by SS Prinz Eugen Division, one of them being Keserović. Keserović was probably the most active commander of Mihailović's Chetniks in Serbia.

The Operation Kopaonik was aimed against the insurgent Chetnik units in Central Serbia under command of Major Dragutin Keserović in the region around Kriva Reka on Kopaonik mountain. The operation was aimed against this forces because they were considered as center of organized guerilla rebel forces in Central Serbia. The operation was in fact punitive expedition aimed against Mihailovićs Chetniks who were the chief target of the German commands who wanted to secure its control of Serbia before important battles in North Africa.

The outline of the operation was prepared on 30 September and the order for its execution was issued on 5 October 1942.

Forces 
The Axis forces in the Operation Kopaonik consisted of 7th SS Volunteer Mountain Division Prinz Eugen and several battalions of Bulgarian 9th Infantry Division. According to some sources the Bulgarian forces included 36th Infantry Regiment. This operation was the first large-scale engagement of the 7th SS Volunteer Mountain Division Prinz Eugen under command of Artur Phleps who personally commanded the Axis forces during Operation Kopaonik. The SS division had three regiments, two infantry and one artillery regiment. One of those two regiments that participated in the Operation Kopaonik was 14th SS Infangry Regiment with total number of soldiers, together with supporting artillery regiment, of up to 6,000 men (according to Schmidhuber). The German forces were also supported by Russian Protective Corps. The commander of the 14th SS Infantry Regiment was August Schmidhuber while its three battalions were commanded by Richard Kaaserer, Wagner and Landverer. Several Bulgarian battalions of 1,000 men and Russian Protective Corps with 300 men also participated in this operation. The commander of Bulgarian forces that participated in the operation was Petar Panev.

The attacked Yugoslav rebel forces of Draža Mihailović were organized into Rasina Corps under command of Major Dragutin Keserović. In May 1942 Mihailović ordered to Keserović to prepare for receiving military supplies from Allies through air transport. Starting in the half of 1942, Allied airplanes supplied with arms and other military equipment to Chetnik detachment on Kopaonik. The Axis forces were informed that the headquarters of this Chetnik unit was in village Kriva Reka and that a British military mission was with them. In August 1942 joint Axis forces of German and Bulgarian troops attacked Chetniks of Major Keserović on Kopaonik and captured 9 members of his headquarter, three of them being members of British mission, executed when they were leaving village Kriva Reka.

Course of the operation 

The Operation Kopaonik began on 11 October 1942 when the 1st battalion advanced toward Chetnik forces in Kriva Reka from Kosovska Mitrovica, the 2nd battalion advanced from Raška and parts of the 3rd battalion advanced from Novi Pazar. The Bulgarian battalions advanced from Brus and Aleksandrovac.

On 12 October 1942 the Axis troops completely encircled Kriva Reka village. They stormed into this village because they were informed that headquarter of Rasina Corps of Keserović and Chetniks under his command were in the village.

Keserović was informed about the attack of Axis forces and successfully retreated units of his detachment.

Himmler was pleased with the Prince Eugen Division and visited it for three days as soon as the Operation Kopaonik was ended. After the operation was finished, on 18 October Himmler arrived to Kraljevo and celebrated birthday of Prince Eugene of Savoy together with members of SS Division that bore his name.

In his order issued for this operation on 5 October 1942, the commander of Axis forces in this operation, Arthur Phleps, ordered to his units to consider entire population of the region as rebel sympathizers. When Axis forces failed to capture and destroy Chetniks in Kriva Reka, they punished the village and burned all houses in the village. The Axis troops captured civilians who lived in the village and took them to the village church and blow it up. There were 46 men, women and children who were killed in the destroyed church. This massacre was committed against the order of the Captain Kaaserer. The number of murdered civilians in Kriva Reka was more than 300. The total number of civilians murdered during this operation is 690.

During the second half of October 1942 Prinz Eugen Division attacked Mihailovićs Chetniks in Gornji Milanovac and Čačak. At that time, General Mihailovic was with his Supreme Command in Montenegro, which was under Italian occupation. From the beginning of 1943, General Mihailovic prepared his units for the supports of Allied landing on the Adriatic coast. General Mihailovic hoped that the Western Alliance would open the Second Front in the Balkans.

Aftermath and legacy 

After being informed about massacre of civilian population, the German military commander of Serbia Paul Bader requested from the commander of SS division to refrain from killing civilians and burning villages without particular reason in future. Because of the conduct during the Operation Kopaonik which included the mass murder of civilians in Kriva Reka, the commander of the 1st battalion Richard Kaaserer was dismissed from the SS, though he was quickly assigned to another German unit and swiftly promoted. Kaaserer was captured after the war in Norway, with forged documents under a false name. He was extradited to Yugoslavia, tried for war crimes, including those in Kriva Reka, sentenced to death and hanged in Belgrade in January 1947.

The tragedy of Kriva Reka village inspired Dobrica Ćosić to describe terrible death of imprisoned villagers in their church in his book Deobe. In 2017 editor Goran Erčević recorded a documentary "Cry of Empty Cradle" inspired with massacre of civilians in Kriva Reka, while poet and writer Goran Minić wrote a book about it.

References

Sources

Further reading

External links 
 Chasing the ghosts - Text in Politikin Zabavnik about the Operation Kopaonik

Yugoslavia in World War II
Military operations of World War II involving Germany
1942 in Yugoslavia
Conflicts in 1942
Battles of World War II involving Chetniks